Bobby Thoms (15 July 1909 – 6 February 2003) was an Australian rules footballer who played with Sandringham Football Club in the VFA, and St Kilda in the Victorian Football League (VFL).

Football
The former Essendon footballer Clarrie Hearn was appointed captain-coach of Sandringham for the 1936 season. In June 1936, Hearn tendered his resignation, citing "pressure of business". Rather than seek another coach externally, Sandringham decided to split the coaching duties between the team's captain, Bob Thoms, as captain-coach, and its vice-captain, Bill Mitchell, as his assistant, for the rest of the season.

Notes

References
 Holmesby, Russell; Main, Jim (2014). The Encyclopedia of AFL Footballers: every AFL/VFL player since 1897 (10th ed.). Melbourne, Victoria: Bas Publishing.

External links 
 
 
 R. "Bob" Thoms, at The VFA Project.

1909 births
2003 deaths
Australian rules footballers from Melbourne
Australian Rules footballers: place kick exponents
St Kilda Football Club players
Williamstown Football Club players
Sandringham Football Club coaches
People from Brighton, Victoria